David Jones (April 13, 1841 - June 18, 1911) was an American soldier and recipient of the Medal of Honor who received the award for his actions in the American Civil War.

Biography
Jones was born in Fayette County, Ohio on April 13, 1841. He served as a private with Company F of the 22nd Ohio Volunteer Infantry and than moved to Company C of the 54th Ohio Volunteer Infantry Regiment and eventually after his heroic efforts at Vicksburg as first lieutenant in Company I of the 54th Ohio Volunteer Infantry Regiment during the American Civil War. Prior to becoming a lieutenant, he was promoted to sergeant sometime in 1864. He earned his medal in action at the Battle of Vicksburg, Mississippi in a forlorn hope attack on Vicksburg with 149 other men on May 22, 1863. In 1865, he married Rosellie A. Smith and made a living in Good Hope, Ohio. Jones and Smith had six children. He received his medal on June 13, 1894. He died on June 18, 1911, as a result of heart failure and is now buried in Good Hope Cemetery, Good Hope, Ohio.

Medal of Honor Citation
For gallantry in the charge of the volunteer storming party on 22 May 1863, in action at Vicksburg, Mississippi.

References

1841 births
1911 deaths
American Civil War recipients of the Medal of Honor
People from Fayette County, Ohio
Union Army officers